Oding may refer to:

People and characters
 Oding Paguio, Philippine politician; see List of political families in the Philippines

Fictional characters
 Oding, a fictional character from the 2022 Indonesian TV drama Menolak Talak (TV series)
 Oding, a fictional character from the 2013 Indonesian TV soap opera Magic (TV series)
 Oding, a fictional character from the 2012 Indonesian anthology horror film Hi5teria

Other uses
 Overdosing (ODing), the process of having a drug overdose
 Online dating (ODing)
 Oding, composing odes

See also

 
 OD (disambiguation)
 Ode (disambiguation)
 Odes (disambiguation)
 Oder (disambiguation)